The European Grasstrack Sidecar Championship is a motorcycle event and is organised by Union Européenne de Motocyclisme. The first championship took place in 1980 at Melsungen, West Germany. It has run every year since except for 2015 as it was cancelled due to Stefan Muller losing his life in practice. The most successful nation is Germany. The European Solo Grasstrack Championship start in 1978.

The championships are run for 500cc Sidecars only and to qualify for the Final there are semi-finals. From 1980 there were two semi-finals and from 2012 there has been just one semi with the others qualifying automatically through there domestic championships. The first ever semi-final took place at Assen in the Netherlands on 19 April 1980. The first winners were the West German team of Otto Bauer and Peter Stiegelbrunner, second were England's Rob Stoneman and Rowland Broomfield and another West German team took third on the podium Harald Haus and Dietmar Haus.

The sport is popular in Germany, the Netherlands, France and the United Kingdom although there have been teams from Switzerland, Denmark, Norway, Sweden and Russia also.

Most successful
Thomas Kunert is the most successful rider. He has taken the title on at eleven occasions and he also has five second and one third. He also holds the record for semi-final wins with 19. Kunert won a semi-final in every year from 1994 to 2007.

Medalists

Driver champions

Passenger champions

Results by country

Medal percentage

European Solo Championship
The European Solo Grasstrack championship first ran in 1978.

References

Motorcycling events